Qasemabad (also Romanized as Qāsemābād and Qasemābād) is a village in Ganjabad Rural District, Esmaili District, Anbarabad County, Kerman Province, Iran. At the 2006 census, its population was 581, in 131 families.

References 

Populated places in Anbarabad County